Gerlize de Klerk (born 23 March 1989) is a retired South African javelin thrower.

She won the gold medal at the 2007 African Junior Championships, the silver medal at the 2011 All-Africa Games and the bronze medal at the 2012 African Championships. She also competed at the 2005 World Youth Championships without reaching the final.

Her personal best throw is 56.04 metres, achieved in March 2011 in Germiston.

Results Summary

References

1989 births
Living people
South African female javelin throwers
African Games silver medalists for South Africa
Athletes (track and field) at the 2011 All-Africa Games
African Games medalists in athletics (track and field)